Bosleake is a mining hamlet southwest of Redruth in west Cornwall, England, UK. It is in the civil parish of Carn Brea.

References

Hamlets in Cornwall